Reclamation Street is a street stretching from Jordan to Mong Kok, Kowloon, Hong Kong. As its name suggests, it was built on the reclaimed western shore of the Kowloon Peninsula.

Location
Reclamation Street is on a north–south axis and runs mostly parallel to and west of Nathan Road. It starts at the junction with Nanking Street in the south and ends in the north at the junctions of Lai Chi Kok Road and Prince Edward Road West in the Prince Edward area. The street is mostly located between Canton Road on the west and Shanghai Street on the east. It's interrupted in two locations, and is thus made up of three sections - The Jordon section in the south, the middle section in Yau Ma Tei and the Mong Kok section in the north.

Features
For the most part, Reclamation Street is closed to public traffic. The street features one of the largest if not longest fresh produce markets in Hong Kong. 

Being an old services district, the street is typically lined with old residential buildings usually no more than 5 storeys high. Most of these buildings are walk-ups, meaning, they have no elevators. At the street level, there's a wide range of wholesale and service type businesses - typically workshops of one sort or other, ship chandlers, catering and other similarly related small businesses. The wholesale Yau Ma Tei Fruit Market and the former Yaumati Theatre are located at the street's junction with Waterloo Road.

Trivia

The herbalist store Sang Sang (生生藥行), which is located at house number 66 on this street, was a site of the Detour in the seventh leg of the reality TV show The Amazing Race 2.

See also
 List of streets and roads in Hong Kong

External links

Google Maps of Reclamation Street 
 
Reclamation Street market - scenes and views of Hong Kong's largest if not longest fresh produce market

Yau Ma Tei
Street markets in Hong Kong
Roads in Kowloon